Nylon Guys was an American magazine devoted to men. Its coverage focuses on the interests of guys, including art, music, design, technology, fashion and travel.

History
Nylon Guys was founded in 2004 by the original co-creator of Nylon, Jaclynn Jarrett. It began as a companion publication being included with issues of Nylon.

Nylon Guys was published seasonally, twice a year with a circulation of 110,000 copies. The magazine featured a variety of celebrity men on their covers, including Jesse Eisenberg, Gerard Way, Joseph Gordon-Levitt, Pharrell Williams, and Michael Pitt.

Nylon Guys evolved into an online-only all-digital magazine in 2015. The editor in chief was Michelle Lee between 2014 and late 2015.

References

External links

Bimonthly magazines published in the United States
Fashion magazines published in the United States
Men's magazines published in the United States
Online magazines published in the United States
Defunct magazines published in the United States
Magazines established in 2004
Magazines disestablished in 2015
Magazines published in New York (state)
Men's fashion magazines
Online magazines with defunct print editions